Pouteria tarapotensis is a species of plant in the family Sapotaceae. It is endemic to Peru and Bolivia.

References

tarapotensis
Trees of Bolivia
Trees of Peru
Near threatened plants
Taxonomy articles created by Polbot
Taxa named by Charles Baehni
Taxa named by August W. Eichler
Taxa named by Jean Baptiste Louis Pierre